This is a summary of 1935 in music in the United Kingdom.

Events
February – At the suggestion of Frank Bridge, Benjamin Britten is invited to a job interview by the BBC's director of music Adrian Boult and his assistant Edward Clark. 
12 March – Jack Hylton makes his first recording since leaving the Decca label, for HMV.
19 November – Kathleen Ferrier marries Albert Wilson; the marriage is never consummated.
date unknown – Michael Tippett joins the British Communist Party.

Popular music
 "Fanlight Fanny", words & music by George Formby, Harry Gifford and Frederick E. Cliffe
 "Men About Town", words & music by Noël Coward
 "Mrs Worthington", words & music by Noël Coward
 "The Canoe Song", by Mischa Spoliansky (sung by Paul Robeson in the film Sanders of the River)
 "Where the Arches Used To Be", by D. O'Connor and K. Russell, performed by Flanagan and Allen
 "Who's Been Polishing The Sun", words & music by Noel Gay

Classical music: new works
Arnold Bax – Symphony No. 6
Arthur Bliss – Music for Strings
Sir George Dyson – Belshazzar's Feast
Joseph Holbrooke – Aucassin and Nicolette (ballet)
Michael Tippett – String Quartet No. 1
William Walton – Symphony No. 1
Ralph Vaughan Williams – Symphony No. 4
Charles Williams – Majestic Fanfare

Film and Incidental music
Jack Beaver – Airport
Benjamin Britten – God's Chillun
Louis Levy – Hyde Park Corner
Eric Spear – Play Up the Band
William Trytel – The Triumph of Sherlock Holmes

Musical theatre
25 February – Jack O'Diamonds (w. Clifford Gray & H. F. Maltby, m. Noel Gay) opens at the Gaiety Theatre; it later transfers to the Cambridge Theatre and runs for 126 performances in all.
2 May – Glamorous Night (w. Christopher Hassall m. Ivor Novello) opens at the Theatre Royal, Drury Lane, and runs for 243 performances.

Musical films
Be Careful, Mr Smith, starring Bobbie Comber
Brewster's Millions, directed by Thornton Freeland, starring Jack Buchanan and Lili Damita 
Come Out of the Pantry, directed by Jack Raymond, starring Jack Buchanan, Fay Wray and James Carew
The Divine Spark, directed by Carmine Gallone, starring Marta Eggerth and Philip Holmes
Heart's Desire, directed by Paul L. Stein, starring Richard Tauber and Leonora Corbett
In Town Tonight, directed by Herbert Smith, starring Jack Barty and Stanley Holloway
Music Hath Charms, directed by Thomas Bentley, starring Henry Hall and Carol Goodner
Radio Pirates, directed by Ivar Campbell, starring Leslie French and Mary Lawson
Variety, directed by Adrian Brunel, starring George Carney and Barry Livesey

Births
5 February – Alex Harvey, rock singer (died 1982)
27 February – Alberto Remedios, operatic tenor (died 2016)
4 March – Nancy Whiskey, folk singer (died 2003)
29 March – Delme Bryn-Jones, operatic baritone (died 2001)
19 April – Dudley Moore, composer, jazz pianist, actor (died 2002)
15 August –  Jim Dale, actor, singer, and songwriter
1 October – Julie Andrews, singer and actress
4 November – Elgar Howarth, conductor and composer
5 November – Nicholas Maw, composer (died 2009)
23 December – Johnny Kidd, singer (died 1966)

Deaths
3 March – Caradog Roberts, composer, 56 
17 March – Mary Grant Carmichael, pianist and composer, 83
17 April – Templar Saxe, actor and singer, 69
28 April – Sir Alexander Campbell Mackenzie, composer, 87
3 May – Charles Manners, operatic bass and opera manager, 77
19 July – Philip Napier Miles, philanthropist, music patron and composer, 70
2 September – Isidore de Lara, singer and composer, 77
27 September – Alan Gray, organist and composer, 79
6 October – Frederic Hymen Cowen, pianist, conductor and composer, 83

See also
 1935 in British television
 1935 in the United Kingdom
 List of British films of 1935

References

British Music, 1935 in
Music
British music by year
1930s in British music